KMOZ may refer to:

 KMOZ-FM, a radio station (92.3 FM) licensed to Grand Junction, Colorado, United States
 KMOZ (AM), a radio station (1590 AM) licensed to Rolla, Missouri, United States
 KKVT, a radio station (100.7 FM) licensed to Grand Junction, Colorado, United States, which held the call sign KMOZ-FM from 2001 to 2013